"Take You Out" is a song by American recording artist Luther Vandross. It was written by Warryn Campbell, Harold Lilly, and John Smith and produced by the former for Vandross's self-titled twelfth studio album (2001). Released as the album's lead single, the song topped the US Adult R&B Songs chart and became a top ten hit on the Hot R&B/Hip-Hop Songs, while peaking at number 26 on the Billboard Hot 100. "Take You Out" was later interpolated  by American rapper Jay-Z in his song "Excuse Me Miss", on his album The Blueprint 2: The Gift & The Curse, released in 2002.

Track listing
US CD single

UK maxi single

Charts

Weekly charts

Year-end charts

References

2001 songs
2001 singles
Luther Vandross songs
Songs written by Warryn Campbell
J Records singles
Songs written by Harold Lilly (songwriter)